PNS Shah Jahan of Shahjahan may refer to one of the following ships of the Pakistan Navy:

 , the former British  HMS Charity (R29) launched in 1944; acquired by the Pakistan Navy via the United States in 1958; ship was badly damaged in 1971 in the Indo-Pakistani War; scrapped in 1982
Expended as a target in 2021
 PNS Shah Jahan（F264), the 

Pakistan Navy ship names